Solomon Lee Kui Nang (born 6 June 1936) is a Hong Kong former sports shooter. He competed at the 1976 Summer Olympics and the 1984 Summer Olympics.

References

External links
 

1936 births
Living people
Hong Kong male sport shooters
Olympic shooters of Hong Kong
Shooters at the 1976 Summer Olympics
Shooters at the 1984 Summer Olympics
Place of birth missing (living people)
Shooters at the 1974 Asian Games
Asian Games competitors for Hong Kong
Commonwealth Games medallists in shooting
Commonwealth Games gold medallists for Hong Kong
Shooters at the 1982 Commonwealth Games
Medallists at the 1982 Commonwealth Games